Space Is Only Noise is the debut studio album by Chilean-American musician Nicolás Jaar, released on 28 January 2011 by Circus Company.

In 2012 it was awarded a silver certification from the Independent Music Companies Association which indicated sales of at least 20,000 copies throughout Europe.

Critical reception

At Metacritic, which assigns a normalised rating out of 100 to reviews from mainstream critics, Space Is Only Noise received an average score of 86, based on 15 reviews, indicating "universal acclaim".  Resident Advisor named it album of the year and Pitchfork placed the album at number 20 on its list of the "Top 50 albums of 2011". Pitchfork also placed the song "Space Is Only Noise If You Can See" at number 44 on its list "The Top 100 Tracks of 2011". In 2019, Pitchfork ranked the album at number 148 on their list of "The 200 Best Albums of the 2010s".

Accolades

Track listing

The original track listing features "I Got A" as track 6, but this track was later removed from the album due to an uncleared sample. Subsequently, the original 14-track version of the album was pulled from stores and replaced with a 13 track version, the same one which can be found on streaming services.

Charts

References

2011 debut albums
Nicolas Jaar albums